Morten Wilhelm Wilhelmsen, known as Wilh. Wilhelmsen (12 July 1839 – 16 November 1910), was a Norwegian shipping magnate.

Wilhelm Wilhelmsen was born at Tønsberg in Vestfold, Norway.  He was apprenticed with Fritz Heinrich Frølich (1807–1877)  who was the founder of Christiania Bank and Kreditkasse. His commercial education continued at business firms in France, Belgium and the Netherlands.

In 1861, he founded a brokerage business in Tønsberg. His own career as a shipowner began with the purchase of the bark  Mathilde in 1865. The shipping company, Wilh. Wilhelmsen  which resulted would eventually become Norway's largest shipping company. By 1886, he had established himself as Tønsberg's largest shipowner.

He was also Mayor of Tønsberg in 1894 and French Consul. He received the Order of St. Olav (Knight First Class) and the French Legion of Honour. He was married to Catharine Lorentzen (1843–1919). They were the parents of shipowner Halfdan Wilhelmsen (1864–1923), factory owner Finn Wilhelmsen (1867–1951), shipowner Wilhelm Wilhelmsen (1872–1955), and businessman Axel Wilhelmsen (1881–1957).

References

Related  Literature 
 The history of Wilh. Wilhelmsen
 Oscar A. Johnsen: Tønsberg historie, bind 3, 1952–1954
 Den Kongelige norske Sankt Olavs orden 1847–1947, Grøndahl & Søns Forlag, Oslo, 1947

1839 births
1910 deaths
People from Tønsberg
Mayors of places in Vestfold
Norwegian businesspeople in shipping
Wilhelm
Norwegian company founders
Recipients of the Legion of Honour